La-un is a district (amphoe) of Ranong province, southern Thailand.

History
In 1932 the minor district (king amphoe) was established as a subordinate of Mueang Ranong district. On 28 June 1973, it was upgraded to a full district. In 1996, a new district office was built.

Geography
Neighboring districts are (from the north clockwise) Kra Buri of Ranong Province, Sawi, Lang Suan and Phato of Chumphon province, and Mueang Ranong of Ranong. To the west across the estuary of the Kraburi River is the Tanintharyi Division of Myanmar.

Administration
The district is divided into seven sub-districts (tambons), which are further subdivided into 35 villages (muban). La-un itself is a township (thesaban tambon) and covers parts of tambons La-un Tai and Bang Phra Tai. There are a further three tambon administrative organizations (TAO).

References

External links
amphoe.com

Districts of Ranong province